Joseph "Jack" Buren Cassel II (born August 8, 1980) is a former Major League Baseball pitcher for the San Diego Padres and Houston Astros organizations. He retired from professional baseball in 2010 after suffering a career ending shoulder injury. He now runs the Listings and Capital Markets group for Nasdaq. In addition, he is a co-founder and board member of Players for the Planet, a non-profit organization that utilizes professional athletes to promote and inspire environmental awareness.

Major League Baseball career
Cassel made his Major League Baseball debut with the San Diego Padres on August 10,  in Cincinnati against the Reds. He struck out the first batter he faced, Alex Gonzalez, and surrendered his first hit to Ken Griffey Jr. He was sent back down the next day however, after he gave up 2 runs in 3 innings in his debut. On August 31, Cassel returned to the Major League club and made his first MLB start against the Los Angeles Dodgers. Cassel pitched 5 innings, gave up 3 runs on 10 hits with 5 strikeouts, and was awarded a no decision. He earned his first Major League win on September 17, 2007, beating the Pittsburgh Pirates by pitching 6 scoreless innings. Cassel got his first hit against Milwaukee Brewer's right hander, Yovani Gallardo on an infield single.

Cassel was not offered a new contract by the Padres and became a free agent on December 12, 2007. He signed with the Houston Astros shortly afterwards and competed for a spot in the starting rotation in spring training, but began the year in the minor leagues. Cassel was promoted shortly after and earned his first win of 2008 beating the Cincinnati Reds. A free agent at the end of the season, he signed a minor league contract with the Cleveland Indians in January . Cassel's 2009 season was shortened with a shoulder injury.

Cassel also pitched in the Caribbean Winter Leagues. In 2006, he pitched for the Atenienses de Manatí in Puerto Rico. He was elected to Puerto Rican All Star Game and led the league with the lowest ERA (1.89). In 2009–10, he pitched for the Águilas Cibaeñas in Santiago, Dominican Republic. Following the regular season, he was traded to the Toros del Este in La Romana, Dominican Republic for the playoffs. The team lost in the championship to the Gigantes del Cibao.

Minor League Baseball career
Drafted in the 25th round by the San Diego Padres, Cassel signed a minor league contract June 21, he served mainly as a reliever in the minor leagues until . Cassel pitched for the Idaho Falls Padres, Fort Wayne Wizards, Lake Elsinore Storm, Mobile BayBears and Portland Beavers during his minor league career in the San Diego Padres organization. In 2003, he was awarded the Lake Elsinore Storm Pitcher of the Year. In 2005, he pitched for the Peoria Javalinas in the Arizona Fall League. In 2007, he represented the Portland Beavers at the Pacific Coast League Allstar Game in Albuquerque, New Mexico. On April 19, 2009, Jack earned the very first Win in the new Huntington Park in Columbus, OH as a pitcher for the Columbus Clippers, the Triple-A affiliate of the Cleveland Indians.

Jack hosted a variety of radio shows throughout his time in the minor leagues. During the 2005 - 2007 seasons, he hosted the Toyota Pre-Game Show with Rich Burke on the weekends in Portland, OR.

College
Cassel attended Loyola Marymount University after graduating from John F. Kennedy High School in 1998, where he received All-State Honors in baseball. On February 9, 2008, Cassel's #14 jersey was retired by longtime coach, Manny Alvarado, and the John F. Kennedy Baseball program.

Cassel received his Master of Business Administration from the University of Southern California.

Personal life
Jack's younger brother, Matt Cassel, is a former journeyman American football quarterback who notably played with the New England Patriots and Kansas City Chiefs. His other younger brother, Justin Cassel, was a minor league baseball player in the farm system of the Chicago White Sox and won a silver medal for Team USA. Cassel's wife, Julie Mariani Cassel, is also a former athlete. She was a Captain and Defensive Specialist on the 2002 NCAA Championship USC Women's Volleyball team.

In a strange coincidence on September 7, 2008, Jack replaced injured teammate Wandy Rodriguez in the first inning at Colorado only hours after his brother Matt replaced injured teammate Tom Brady in the first quarter of the season-opening game vs Kansas City. They were the first pair of brothers to win games in two different major sports on the same day.

In 1999, Cassel's brother, Justin Cassel, was on the HBO reality television show Freshman Year. 

In 2007, Cassel's mother, Barbara Brennan Cassel, won a Television Emmy Award for her work as a Set Decorator on Tony Bennett: An American Classic. 

In 2008, Cassel's father, Gregory Cassel, died suddenly at his home in California. He was an actor and screenplay writer.

Cassel's grandfather, Joe B Cassel, was inducted into the Racing Tent Hall of Fame for the IAHA in 1996 and was inducted into the Texas Horse Racing Hall of Fame in 2002. He was the recipient of the Arabian Lifetime Breeders Award in 2001.

Community
Cassel and fellow baseball player Chris Dickerson are the founders of Players for the Planet, a charitable organization that brings professional athletes together to inspire communities to build awareness of the growing environmental crisis. Several athletes including Jay Bruce, Ryan Braun, Matt Cassel, Curtis Granderson are on board to spread the awareness.

On July 19, 2012, Jack Cassel was invited to the White House in Washington D.C for the "White House Sports and Sustainability Forum"

References

External links

1980 births
Living people
Baseball players from California
San Diego Padres players
Houston Astros players
Major League Baseball pitchers
Columbus Clippers players
Idaho Falls Padres players
Fort Wayne Wizards players
Lake Elsinore Storm players
Portland Beavers players
Round Rock Express players
LAPC Brahma Bulls baseball players
Loyola Marymount Lions baseball players
Peoria Javelinas players